Kio Kio or Kiokio is a rural community in the Ōtorohanga District and Waikato region of New Zealand's North Island. It is located just north-east of Ōtorohanga, on State Highway 3 between Ōtorohanga and Te Awamutu.

It is the location of the former Kiokio railway station on the North Island Main Trunk. Traffic at the station was "rapidly increasing" from 1913.

Kiokio is the Māori word for a number of a plant species, including the native fern Parablechnum novae-zelandiae.

Kio Kio has a rugby union club, which plays in the King Country league in red and black. In 2001, a club player was accused of wrenching and squeezing an opponent's testicle. In 2009, two club players, a club official and two club fans received lifetime bans from rugby union for attacking a referee and tough judge after the club lost the King Country Rugby Tournament.

Education

Kio Kio School is a Year 1-8 co-educational state primary school.

References

Ōtorohanga District
Populated places in Waikato